Pupils Association News Agency (PANA) is the Iranian student news agency. It was opened by agreement between the Student Organization and the managing director of Islamic Republic News Agency and confirmed by the Minister of Education and Minister of Islamic Culture in June 2002. These actions were supported by Ayatollah Khamenei.  Its Education service (Iranian School Information” PAMA”) the latest news about schools in Iran and offers journalists, writers and critics to the Iranian media. Now, Ardeshir Dehghani is the Manager of PANA.

Education
PANA began its activities in summer 2003. Its “Student Reporter Club“  trains students to give aware, faithful, expert and committed reports on cultural, scientific, sports and general news reports to the Iranian community.  The training includes three levels; elementary, supplementary and advanced. As of 2011 PANA was training 2,660 active student reporters and 3,500 other student reporters around the country act as volunteer reporters.

Organization
PANA is a subset of the Ministry of Education. PANA launched news services, “10,000 Quran schools” and “student sports” to promote Islamic culture and sports. PANA publishes news of Iranian sports achievements and performance in international, Asian, national and provincial tournaments. PANA News Agency has 32 active agencies in Iran (Provincial) and 12 semi-active agencies outside Iran.

PANA has offices in 100 Iranian schools and 140 Iranian schools around the world.  The central office is at number 2, Kousha Street, down Ershad mosque, Dr Shariati Street, Tehran.

Honorary members
PANA's honorary members include officials of the Islamic Republic of Iran, such as Mahmoud Ahmadinejad.

References
About PANA

2002 establishments in Iran
Government agencies established in 2002
Mass media in Tehran
News agencies based in Iran